Thomas Priour (died 1412), of Hatfield Broad Oak, Essex and Westley Waterless, Cambridgeshire, was an English politician.

He was a Member (MP) of the Parliament of England for Cambridgeshire in 1402.

References

14th-century births
1412 deaths
English MPs 1402
People from Uttlesford (district)
People from East Cambridgeshire District